Kazim Gedik (born 1938) is a Turkish wrestler. He competed in the men's Greco-Roman flyweight at the 1960 Summer Olympics.

References

External links
 

1938 births
Living people
Turkish male sport wrestlers
Olympic wrestlers of Turkey
Wrestlers at the 1960 Summer Olympics
Sportspeople from Konya
20th-century Turkish people